Raymond Peter Moylette (born  11 April 1990), sometimes spelled Moylett, is an Irish professional boxer. As an amateur he represented Ireland, winning gold medals at the 2008 Youth World Championships and 2011 European Championships.

Amateur career

Irish junior titles
Moylette represented the St Anne's Boxing Club in Westport, with whom he has been boxing with since the age of six, and won four national titles ranging from Boy 1 level to the Youth division. In 2007, He won both the Cadet and Youth (Under 19) divisions and also won the Best Boxer of the Championships award in becoming the Youth title holder.

Youth World Championships
At the Youth World Championships in Guadalajara, Mexico, Moylette won the gold medal in the lightweight (60 kg) division, becoming the first Irish boxer in history to win a gold medal at the Youth World Championships. He recently won the Irish senior championships at light welter-weight, beating Ulster champion Stephen Donnelly.

At the Youth Championships, Moylette defeated Fred Evans of Wales and Cuba's Juan Garcia to get to the final where he beat Kazakhstan's Daniyar Yeleussinov to take the title.

European Championships
Despite having been beaten in the quarter-final of The Irish National Championships, Moylette was sent to the 2011 European Championships in Ankara, Moylette secured at least a silver medal in the light-welterweight division after victory over Hajiliyev Heybatulla of Azerbaijan in the semi-finals on 23 June. On 24 June, he went on to win the gold medal after an 18-10 victory against Tom Stalker.

Professional career
Moylette is trained by Paschal Collins, brother of World Champion, Steve Collins. He made his pro debut in March 2017 at The Grand Connaught Rooms in London, with three more victories that year in Boston, USA.

By June 2017, Moylette would build an unblemished 11-0 record. He then challenged for his first professional title in his home county of Mayo. Moylette would face Mexican Christian Uruzquieta for the World Boxing Council International Silver Lightweight title.

Personal life
Moylette attended Davitt College in Castlebar for his secondary school education. He married his long-time girlfriend Sharon McGing on 28 December 2017.

Professional boxing record

References
,

1990 births
Living people
Sportspeople from County Mayo
Lightweight boxers
Irish male boxers
People from Castlebar